Felipe Valenzuela Herrera (born 8 October 1941) is a Chilean politician and lawyer who is member of the Senate of Chile.

References

External links
 BCN Profile

1941 births
Living people
20th-century Chilean lawyers
University of Chile alumni
Party for Democracy (Chile) politicians
Socialist Party of Chile politicians